Dashqotan is a village in Nineveh Governorate, Iraq. It is located in the Tel Kaif District in the Nineveh Plains.

In the village, there is a church of the Virgin Mary of the Ancient Church of the East.

History
The Assyrian Aid Society provided a water pump for the village in 2012. The Supreme Committee of Christian Affairs had constructed 33 houses and a church at Dashqotan by 2013. The village's population was forced to flee the Islamic State of Iraq and the Levant offensive in August 2014. In 2015, 15 displaced Christian families inhabited Dashqotan. A power generator was provided to the village by the United States Agency for International Development in October 2019. As of March 2021, the village is inhabited by 112 Assyrians in 25 families.

Gallery

References
Notes

Citations

Bibliography

 
 
 

Assyrian communities in Iraq
Populated places in Nineveh Governorate
Nineveh Plains